The following tables list the major theatre awards and nominations received with respect to major market productions of the  musical The King and I, by the team of Rodgers and Hammerstein.

The musical premiered on March 29, 1951, at Broadway's St. James Theatre.  The musical won Tony Awards for Best Musical, Best Actress (for Gertrude Lawrence) and Best Featured Actor (for Yul Brynner).  It played for 1,246 performances.  A London run and U.S. national tour followed, and subsequent productions have earned further theatre awards.

Original Broadway production

1977 Broadway revival

1979 West End revival

1985 Broadway revival

1996 Broadway revival

2000 West End revival

2015 Broadway revival

2018 West End revival

References

King and I, The
Musicals by Rodgers and Hammerstein